Ernest Hoyt Brown (October 1872 – September 26, 1905) was an American college football player and coach.  As a graduate student at the University of Georgia, served as the head coach of the Georgia Bulldogs football team for one year in 1893, compiling a record of 2–2–1.  Brown was more of a trainer than he was a coach and knew more about tending to sore muscles than the game of football.  He also played halfback in at least one game, the game against Georgia Tech.  Brown was the last unpaid coach head football coach at Georgia.

He left the University of Georgia in January 1894. He later worked as a stenographer and married Leila Cook. His wife, Leila died January 18, 1900; he had one son, Warren with her.

Brown was reported to be critically ill in The Athens Banner, September 26, 1905, with the newspaper noting that "The many friends of Mr. Ernest S. Brown will be pained to learn that he is critically ill at his home on Barber street and that there is very small hope entertained for his recovery." He died that morning of the publication. His funeral was held in Athens on September 28 with burial in Oconee cemetery.

Head coaching record

References

1872 births
1905 deaths
19th-century players of American football
American football halfbacks
Georgia Bulldogs football coaches
Georgia Bulldogs football players
Players of American football from Georgia (U.S. state)
Sportspeople from Athens, Georgia